Hugo Wathne (25 September 1932 – 6 September 2017) was a Norwegian sculptor and art instructor.

Biography
Hugo Frank Wathne was born in Stavanger, Norway to Frank Ingolf Wathne and Birgit Rosenvold. His father was a painter and glass artist. 

Wathne  was first a student of sculptor Magnus Vigrestad. He attended the  Norwegian National Academy of Craft and Art Industry (Statens Håndverks- og Kunstindustriskole) in  Oslo (1949–54) and  the Norwegian National Academy of Fine Arts (Statens Kunstakademi) in  Oslo under Per Palle Storm (1954–57) and Per Krohg (1957-58). He trained in Copenhagen under Gottfred Eickhoff (1959) and attended the Académie de la Grande Chaumiere in Paris (1965–66).

He was awarded the Stavanger bys kulturstipend (1956), Schäffers legat (1957); Statens reisestipend (1957); Lorch-Schives legat (1962); Rolf Stenersens legat (1968) and Bærum kommunes kulturstipend (1977). He conducted study trips to study trips Sweden, Italy, France, Greece, Spain and Germany. He is represented at the National Gallery of Norway with the sculpture Inntrykk fra en reise from 1981. Among his other works are Brevduen (1970) and Akrobatfamilie (1971).

ademi
He was an art instructor in sculpture at Vestlandets kunstakademi in Bergen 1969-70, in ceramics at Bergen kunsthåndverkskole 1971-72  and taught at   Kunstskolen in Rogaland from 1978. In 2009, he was  awarded the Ingeborg og Per Palle Storms ærespris. The prize was granted jointly with Bård Breivik (1948–2016) for their significant effort for Norwegian figurative art. Hugo Wathne died during 2017 at Stavanger.

Personal life
He was shortly married from 1950 until 1951 to writer and actress Berit Brænne (1918–1976).

References

External links
Hugo Wathne website

Other sources
Fredrik Koch (2008) Hugo: Hugo Wathnes kunst (Mosaikk forlag) 

1932 births
2017 deaths
People from Stavanger
Oslo National Academy of the Arts alumni
Norwegian sculptors
Norwegian educators